The seventh season of The Voice Kids premiered on TV Globo on May 1, 2022 in the  (BRT / AMT) daytime slot. 

Carlinhos Brown and Michel Teló returned for their seventh and second season as coaches, respectively, while Gaby Amarantos was replaced by sisters Maiara & Maraisa.

Michel Teló tested positive for COVID-19 prior to the taping of the Showdowns episodes on May 28–29. As result, it was announced that his team would be coached by singer Toni Garrido instead, with Teló returning as coach for the Live shows.

On July 17, 2022, Isis Testa from Team Maiara & Maraisa won the competition with 43.65% of the final vote over Isadora Pedrini (Team Brown) and Mel Grebin (Team Teló). It was the first season to feature an all-female final three.

Teams
 Key

Blind auditions
Key

The Battles

Showdowns

Live shows

Week 1: Semifinals

Week 2: Finals

Elimination chart
Key

	

Results

Ratings and reception

Brazilian ratings
All numbers are in points and provided by Kantar Ibope Media.

References

External links
The Voice Kids on Gshow.com

Kids 7
2022 Brazilian television seasons